Silks and Saddles may refer to:

 Silks and Saddles (1921 film), an Australian film
 Silks and Saddles (1929 film), an American drama film
 Silks and Saddles (1936 film), an American film